The Rising of the Priests, also known as the Maltese Rebellion of 1775 and the September 1775 Rebellion, was an uprising led by Maltese clergy against the Order of Saint John, who had sovereignty over Malta. The uprising took place on 8 September 1775, but was suppressed by the Order within a few hours. The rebels were then captured and some were executed, exiled or imprisoned.

Background 
The causes of the revolt can be traced back to 1773, when Francisco Ximénez de Tejada was elected Grand Master upon the death of Manuel Pinto da Fonseca. Ximénez found a depleted treasury, so he introduced austerity measures, including reducing spending and increasing the price of corn. These made him unpopular, both with the clergy and the common people.

Ximénez issued an edict banning the hunting of hares by the common people, in order to reserve the hunt for the elite. The ban was opposed by Bishop Giovanni Carmine Pellerano and the clergy. Other events also created tension between the clergy and the Order.

Revolt 
Due to the tension between the Order and the clergy, and the negative public opinion of Ximénez, some priests led by Don Gaetano Mannarino began to plot against the Order. They chose 8 September as the day of the rebellion, when the Order's ships were at sea with the Spanish Navy and Valletta was not well defended. A total of 28 clergymen and a larger number of laymen were involved in the planning of the uprising.

On the day of the revolt, only eighteen of the 28 clergymen showed up. Despite this, Mannarino still decided to carry on with the uprising. A group of thirteen men took over Fort Saint Elmo on the northern tip of Valletta, while the rest of the rebels captured Saint James Cavalier on the opposite end of the city. In both cases, the Order's flag was lowered and the banner of St. Paul was hoisted instead.

When the uprising broke out, Ximénez summoned the Council of State to see how to suppress the revolt. The Council sent the Vicar General to find out the demands of the rebels, who agreed to negotiate. However, at one point they threatened to blow up St. Elmo's gunpowder magazine, which would cause severe damage to the fort and the city's fortifications. Due to this, the Order decided to recapture the occupied fortifications by force. St. Elmo was captured after a brief exchange of fire, while St. James surrendered soon afterwards. Of the 18 priests involved, only 12 remained at their posts to the end.

Aftermath
After surrendering, the rebels were imprisoned in Fort Saint Elmo. The first trials were held in October 1775 and continued after the death of Ximénez on 4 November. Three of the rebels were executed, while others were imprisoned, exiled or acquitted.

The ringleader Mannarino was one of those sentenced to life imprisonment. He was eventually released along with other political prisoners, after over twenty years imprisonment, during the French occupation of Malta in 1798. He died in 1814, at the age of 81.

Notes

References 

18th century in Valletta
Conflicts in 1775
18th-century rebellions
Rebellions in Malta
1775 in Malta
Military history of the Knights Hospitaller